William Morgan Fletcher-Vane, 1st Baron Inglewood, TD (12 April 1909 – 22 June 1989), was a British Conservative Party politician.

Early life
Inglewood was the son of Lieutenant-Colonel the Hon. William Lyonel Vane, a descendant of Gilbert Vane, 2nd Baron Barnard. His uncle Henry de Vere Vane had succeeded as ninth Baron Barnard in 1891 on the death of his distant relative Harry Powlett, 4th Duke of Cleveland and 8th Baron Barnard. Inglewood's mother was Lady Katherine Louisa Pakenham, daughter of William Pakenham, 4th Earl of Longford (hence Frank Pakenham, 7th Earl of Longford, was his first cousin).

On 9 April 1931, shortly before his 22nd birthday, he assumed by deed poll the additional surname of Fletcher, and subsequently inherited the estates of Hutton that were then in the possession of the Fletcher-Vane baronets under the control of trustees. Inglewood was a distant cousin of the Fletcher-Vane baronets (they shared descent from Sir Henry Vane the Elder) but Sir Francis Fletcher-Vane, 5th and last of the Fletcher-Vane baronets of Hutton, was still alive in 1931 when Inglewood inherited. In 1883, the estate of the Fletcher-Vane baronets comprised some 7,194 acres. After a year of ill health, Sir Francis died in a nursing home in Lambeth in 1934. On his death, the Fletcher-Vane baronetcy became extinct.

He was educated at Charterhouse and at Trinity College, Cambridge.

Career
Inglewood served in the Second World War in France and the Middle East as a Lieutenant-Colonel in the Durham Light Infantry, and was mentioned in despatches.

He was elected at the 1945 general election as Member of Parliament for Westmorland, and held the seat until his retirement from the House of Commons at the 1964 general election. He held ministerial office twice, in Anthony Eden and Harold Macmillan's 1957–1964 government: as Parliamentary Secretary to the Minister for Pensions from 1958 to 1960, and as Parliamentary Secretary to the Ministry of Agriculture, Fisheries and Food from 1960 to 1962. He was also Leader of the United Kingdom Delegation to the World Food Congress in Washington, D.C., in 1963.

On 30 June 1964, he was ennobled as Baron Inglewood, of Hutton in the Forest in the County of Cumberland.

Personal life
Lord Inglewood married Mary Proby, daughter of Sir Richard George Proby, 1st Baronet, in 1949. They had two sons.

He died in June 1989, aged 80, and was succeeded in the barony by his son Richard, who also became a Conservative politician. His second son, Christopher, a barrister, was Portcullis Pursuivant from 2012 to 2017, and appointed Chester Herald in 2017.

References

External links 
 

thepeerage.com

1909 births
1989 deaths
People educated at Charterhouse School
Alumni of Trinity College, Cambridge
Durham Light Infantry officers
British Army personnel of World War II
Fletcher-Vane, William
Fletcher-Vane, William
Fletcher-Vane, William
Fletcher-Vane, William
Fletcher-Vane, William
Fletcher-Vane, William
Fletcher-Vane, William
William
Hereditary barons created by Elizabeth II
Ministers in the Macmillan and Douglas-Home governments, 1957–1964